Yuanbao District is a district of the city of Dandong, Liaoning, People's Republic of China.

Administrative Divisions
There are six subdistricts and one town in the district.

Subdistricts:
Liudaokou Subdistricts, Qidao Subdistrict, Badao Subdistrict, Jiudao Subdistrict, Guangji Subdistrict, Xingdong Subdistrict

The only town is Jinshan.

References

County-level divisions of Liaoning